A wall newspaper or placard newspaper is a hand-lettered or printed newspaper designed to be displayed and read in public places both indoors and outdoors, utilizing vertical surfaces such as walls, boards, and fences. The practice dates back to at the least the years of the Roman Empire. They are often produced by governmental entities, or local authorities in locations where production costs or distribution problems might otherwise make regular newspaper distribution either difficult or unnecessary.

20th-century usage

Soviet Russia and Soviet Union

During the Russian Revolution of 1917 and the Russian Civil War, which followed, the use of wall newspapers came into vogue in Soviet Russia. These so-called "placard newspapers" are said to have begun due to a chronic shortage of newsprint paper resulting from war conditions, blockade, and economic dislocation. The papers were first used in military barracks as a means of disseminating official government information, but their use was soon common in factories, schools, and other locations where large numbers of people congregated.

These wall poster newspapers soon came to be seen as efficient vehicles for publicity and propaganda in a factory setting even after the end of the newsprint shortage, as one early account noted:
It is by no means the ambition of the placard newspaper to supplant the printed periodical. Its object is rather to throw light on such questions as cannot be treated in the columns of the general newspapers, for lack of space. ... Each labor community ... has found it advisable to encourage a public discussion of the current problems of its specific production, and to induce all its workers, even the most backward,to take part in this discussion. The placard newspaper is particularly devoted to these specific interests of each industry.

Early Soviet wall newspapers were frequently produced by an editorial board of 3–5 people, who frequently made use of the news reports of so-called "worker-correspondents".

Wall poster newspapers were also used in small or remote villages in Soviet Russia, in which no other news source was available. These village wall papers sought to build literacy among a largely illiterate population and to inculcate pro-regime values among the rural population.

Germany

Wall newspapers were frequently used in factories of Communist East Germany during the second half of the 20th century as a mechanism for publicity and propaganda. The form of these publications was at times more akin to a bulletin board than a formal newspaper.

China

Under the reign of Mao Zedong, wall newspapers were "forward and full of pathos-filled propaganda about current events" and the "large victories for our grand nation", according to Qiu Xiaolong.

United States

In the United States wall newspapers were sometimes used by the Communist movement as a training vehicle in youth and adult education groups, simultaneously teaching the elements of journalism while reinforcing the party's values and ideology among readers.

Wall newspapers also periodically emerged in a factory setting as a means of spreading information within the workplace, particularly during times of labor discord and strikes.

See also 

 Big-character poster
 Pashkevil
 Wochenspruch der NSDAP

Footnotes

Further reading

 Seema Sharma, Development of Journalism. New Delhi, India: Anmol Publications, 2005.

External links
 J. S. Ifthekhar, "Wall Newspaper Has Come to Stay", The Hindu, 6 December 2011.

Newspaper distribution
Propaganda techniques by medium